Văn Lãng is a rural district of Lạng Sơn province in the Northeast region of Vietnam. As of 2003 the district had a population of 50,210. The district covers an area of 561 km². The district capital lies at Na Sầm.

References

Districts of Lạng Sơn province
Lạng Sơn province